The State Anthem of the Azerbaijan SSR was the regional anthem of the Azerbaijan Soviet Socialist Republic in the former Soviet Union. It was created in 1944 and was used from 1945 to 1992.

History
In 1930, after 10 years of establishment of the Soviet republic (and while it was part of the within the Transcaucasian SFSR), Azerbaijani composer Uzeyir Hajibeyov wrote the lyrics and composed the music for the new anthem. Hajibeyov also conducted its first premiere in Baku on 28 April 1930; however, little to no information about the anthem's adoption as the State anthem was given.

It was composed by Uzeyir Hajibeyov, who also composed the current national anthem of Azerbaijan. Suleyman Rustam, Samad Vurgun and Huseyn Arif wrote the lyrics which were altered in 1978 to remove mentions of Joseph Stalin. Like many national anthems of the republics of the Soviet Union, this song praised Vladimir Lenin (and formerly Joseph Stalin as well), the October Revolution and Communism. It also praised the friendship of the republics of the Soviet Union. It was also the anthem of Azerbaijan when it gained independence until 1992 when the March of Azerbaijan was restored.

Lyrics

1978–1992 version

1945–1978 version

Translations

See also

Uzeyir Hajibeyov

Notes

References

External links
 Instrumental recording in MP3 format (Full version)
 Instrumental recording in MP3 format (Short version)
MIDI file
Vocal recording in MP3 format
Lyrics - nationalanthems.info
(1945 version)

Azerbaijan SSR
Azerbaijani songs
National symbols of Azerbaijan
Compositions by Uzeyir Hajibeyov
Azerbaijan Soviet Socialist Republic